Isaac James (March 8, 1838 – September 26, 1914) was an American soldier who fought in the American Civil War. James received his country's highest award for bravery during combat, the Medal of Honor. James's medal was won for capturing the flag at Petersburg, Virginia on April 2, 1865. He was honored with the award on May 10, 1865.

James was from Jefferson Township in Ohio.

Medal of Honor citation

See also
List of American Civil War Medal of Honor recipients: G–L

References

1838 births
1914 deaths
American Civil War recipients of the Medal of Honor
People of Ohio in the American Civil War
Union Army soldiers
United States Army Medal of Honor recipients